Sir John de Burdon, acted as the Constable of Berwick Castle, the Sheriff of Berwick during 1298-1303.

Biography
John was a knight from Nottinghamshire & Derbyshire. He was appointed keeper of Berwick Castle in 1298 in Scotland, which was the administrative centre as Sheriff of Berwick during the English administration of Scotland.

Citations

References

People of Medieval Scotland - John Burdon, constable of Berwick

English people of the Wars of Scottish Independence
13th-century English people
14th-century English people
Year of birth unknown
Year of death unknown